Anakena is a privately owned winery based in the Alto Cachapoal area of the Rapel Valley of Chile. It produces a variety of styles. In September 2015 Anakena was bought by Accolade Wines for $30 million.

Overview
Vina Anakena was founded by Felipe Ibáñez and childhood friend, Jorge Gutiérrez, in 1999. The wines are exported to over 40 countries around the world.

Culture
The name Anakena signifies ‘bird cave’ in the Rapa Nui culture (based on the birdman legend). The legend of the Tangata manu (bird-man) tells that the Easter Island seagull, or Manu tara, hid its precious egg in a secret hideaway, or Anakena.  Every year the bravest islanders swam the long distance from Rapa Nui to the islet of Motu Nui in search of the egg. The one who found it and carried it safely back to Rapa Nui was given the title of birdman, or Tangata manu, and bestowed with honour and fortune.

Anakena uses ancestral engravings and pictographs on its labels to reflect its commitment to Chile’s native cultures and show the world the cultural and artistic legacy of all the precolumbian people who preceded them.

Winery

All the wines are bottled in the cellar. There is also a wine store and visitor centre. Tours of the vineyards can be arranged in advance.

Winemaking
Winemaking at Anakena is overseen by chief oenologist, Gonzalo Pérez.  Gonzalo has been making wine for over 15 years and previously held winemaking positions at a number of Chilean wineries including Santa Rita, Viña Francisco de Aguirre, Viña Cantera and Viña Tarapacá.

Anakena Portfolio
Varietal range:
Cabernet Sauvignon,
Merlot,
Carmenère,
Chardonnay,
Sauvignon Blanc,
Cabernet Sauvignon Rose

Indo range:
Merlot-Syrah,
Cabernet-Syrah,
Sauvignon Blanc,
Chardonnay,

Single Vineyard range:
Sauvignon Blanc,
Viognier,
Riesling,
Late Harvest,
Pinot Noir,
Carmenère,
Malbec,
Syrah,
Cabernet Sauvignon

ONA range:
Sauvignon Blanc,
Riesling-Viognier-Chardonnay,
Pinot Noir-Merlot-Syrah-Viognier,
Cabernet Sauvignon-Merlot-Carmenère,
Syrah

References

External links

Anakena